The Mitsubishi Neptune or 4G4 engine is a series of iron-block OHV inline-four engines built by Mitsubishi Motors from June 1971 to 1981. This was to be Mitsubishi's last OHV engine. The inability to clear new passenger car emissions rules for 1978 meant that the Neptunes were replaced by the 4G1 Orion. The Neptune continued to be built until 1979 for commercial vehicles, which suffered less restrictive environmental regulations and until about 1981 for other applications. Around 520,000 Neptune engines were built.

4G41
Displacement — 
Bore x Stroke — 
Power —  at 6,000 rpm (single carb)
 at 6,300 rpm (Galant FTO, twin carb)
 at 2,700 rpm in a 1972 FG15 forklift
Torque —  at 4,000 rpm (single carb)
 at 2,000 rpm in a 1972 FG15 forklift

Applications
Mitsubishi Galant
 1971-1973 Mitsubishi Galant FTO
 1971.10-1979.06 Mitsubishi Delica 75/1400
 Mitsubishi Forklift FG14, FG15

4G42
Displacement — 
Bore x Stroke — 
Power —  SAE at 6,000 rpm
Torque —  at 4,000 rpm

Applications
 1973.02-1975.10 Mitsubishi Lancer A71A
 1973.09-1976.10 Mitsubishi Lancer Van A71V

See also
List of Mitsubishi engines

References

Neptune
Straight-four engines
Gasoline engines by model